Singhwa Khas is a village in Hisar district of Haryana state in India.

References 

Villages in Hisar district